In partner dances, close embrace  is a type of closed position where the leader and follower stand facing each other chest-to-chest in full or partial body contact.  The dancers usually stand offset from one another, such that each has their right foot in between the feet of their partner.  When in close embrace, the dance is led (and followed) with the whole body, rather than with the arms or with visual cues.  Various partner dances make use of this position, most notably Argentine Tango, but also Balboa, Collegiate Shag, Swing Walk, Blues, and others.

See also
 Closed position

Partner dance technique